SM U-12 was a German submarine, built in 1911 and sunk off Scotland in 1915. It was the first submarine to launch a plane at sea. 
U-12 was a Type U 9 U-boat built for the Imperial German Navy. Her construction was ordered on 15 July 1908 and her keel was laid down by Kaiserliche Werft in Danzig. She was launched on 6 May 1910 and commissioned on 13 August 1911.

The German Empire was the first nation to experiment with submarine aircraft carriers. Oberleutnant zur See Friedrich von Arnauld de la Perière of the Naval Air Service and U-12'''s Kapitanleutnant Walther Forstmann theorised that they could increase the range of their seaplanes by carrying the aircraft out to sea on the deck of submarine and launching the seaplanes after the sub partially submerged, allowing the plane to float off.

Service history
On 15 January 1915 U-12 left Zeebrugge transporting a Friedrichshafen FF.29 seaplane on its deck. Once beyond the safety of the breakwater, the captain realised that the heavy swell might swamp the aircraft and ordered the immediate launch of the seaplane. Forstmann flooded the sub's forward tanks and Arnauld floated the seaplane off the deck and took off from the sea. The German plane flew along the English coastline undetected and returned safely to Zeebrugge.U-12 torpedoed the British gunboat  at Deal on 11 November 1914. This was the first Allied casualty from submarines based in Belgian ports.

Fate
The submarine attempted to dive under the surface but was rammed by Ariel. U-12 then surfaced and was shelled by Acheron and Attack and sank with the loss of 19 lives although 10 survivors were rescued.

Wrecksite
In January 2008, divers Jim MacLeod, of Bo'ness, and Martin Sinclair, from Falkirk, found the wreckage of U-12'' about 25 miles from Eyemouth after a five-year search.

Summary of raiding history

Notes

References

Bibliography

External links

U-boats commissioned in 1911
World War I submarines of Germany
Submarine aircraft carriers
U-boats sunk in 1915
1910 ships
Type U 9 submarines
Ships built in Danzig
World War I shipwrecks in the North Sea
U-boats sunk by British warships